Sahih al-Bukhari is a hadith collection and a book of sunnah compiled by the Persian scholar Muḥammad ibn Ismā‘īl al-Bukhārī (810–870) around 846. Alongside Sahih Muslim, it is one of the most valued books in Sunni Islam after the Quran. Both books are part of the Kutub al-Sittah, the six major Sunni collections of hadith of the Islamic prophet Muhammad. It consists of an estimated 7,563 hadith narrations across its 97 chapters.

Content 
Sources differ on the exact number of hadiths in Sahih al-Bukhari, with definitions of hadith varying from a prophetic tradition or sunnah, or a narration of that tradition. Experts have estimated the number of full-isnad narrations in the Sahih at 7,563, with the number reducing to around 2,600 without considerations to repetitions or different versions of the same hadith. Bukhari chose these narrations from a collection of 600,000 narrations he had collected over 16 years. The narrations are distributed across 97 chapters covering fiqh (Islamic jurisprudence), among other subjects. Each chapter contains references to relevant verses from the Quran. It provides proper Islamic guidance in almost all aspects of Muslim life such as the method of performing prayers and other actions of worship directly from Muhammad.

Development

Collection 
It is reported that Bukhari traveled widely throughout the Abbasid Caliphate from the age of 16. Bukhari found the earlier hadith collections including both ṣaḥīḥ (authentic, sound) and hasan narrations. He also found that many of them included daʻīf (weak) narrations. This aroused his interest in compiling hadith whose authenticity was beyond doubt. 

What further strengthened his resolve was something his teacher and contemporary hadith scholar Ishaq Ibn Rahwayh had told him. Bukhari narrates, "We were with Ishaq Ibn Rahwayh who said, "If only you would compile a book of only authentic narrations of the Prophet." This suggestion remained in my heart so I began compiling the Sahih." Bukhari also said, "I saw the Prophet in a dream and it was as if I was standing in front of him. In my hand was a fan with which I was protecting him. I asked some dream interpreters, who said to me, 'You will protect him from lies.' This is what compelled me to produce the Sahih."

Bukhari imposed four conditions the narrators of a hadith must meet, in order for the narration to be included in his Sahih:
 being just, 
 possessing strong memory and all the scholars who possess great knowledge of hadith must agree upon the narrators' ability to learn and memorize, along with their reporting techniques, 
 complete isnad without any missing narrators,
 consecutive narrators in the chain must meet each other.
Bukhari began organizing his book in the Masjid al-Haram in Mecca, before moving to the Al-Masjid an-Nabawi in Medina. Bukhari completed writing the book in Bukhara around 846 (232 AH), before showing it to his teachers for examination and verification. Ibn Hajar al-Asqalani quoted Abu Jaʿfar al-‘Uqaili as saying, "After Bukhari had written the Sahih, he showed it to Ali ibn al-Madini, Ahmad ibn Hanbal, Yahya ibn Ma'in as well as others. They examined it and testified to its authenticity with the exception of four hadith." Ibn Hajar then concluded with al-'Uqaili's saying, "And those four are as Bukhari said, they are authentic." Bukhari spent the last twenty-four years of his life visiting other cities and scholars, making minor revisions to his book and teaching the hadith he had collected. In every city that Bukhari visited, thousands of people would gather to listen to him recite traditions.

Transmission 
Each version of the Sahih is named by its narrator. Ibn Hajar al-Asqalani in his book Nukat asserts the number of narrations is the same in each version. There are many books that noted differences between the different versions, the best known being Fath al-Bari. The version transmitted by Muhammad ibn Yusuf al-Firabri (d. 932), a trusted student of Bukhari, is the most famous version of the Sahih al-Bukhari today. All modern printed version are derived from this version. Al-Khatib al-Baghdadi quoted al-Firabri in History of Baghdad: "About seventy thousand people heard Sahih Bukhari with me." al-Firabri is not the only transmitter of Sahih al-Bukhari. Many others narrated the book, including Ibrahim ibn Ma'qal (d. 907), Hammad ibn Shakir (d. 923), Mansur Burduzi (d. 931) and Husain Mahamili (d. 941).

Derived works 
The orientalist Manjana said in Cambridge in 1936 that the oldest manuscript he had come across up to that point was written in 984 (370 AH), according to the narration of al-Mirwazi from al-Firabri. The oldest full manuscript is a version on the narration of Abu Dharr al-Heravi (d. 1043) written in Maghrebi script, present in the Süleymaniye Library in Istanbul is from 1155 (550 AH).

Commentaries 

The number of detailed commentaries on the Sahih are numbered around 400, including Tafsir al-Gharib ma fi al-Sahihayn by al-Humaydī (d. 1095), Ibn Kathir's (d. 1373) Sharh, Fath al-Bari by Ibn Hajar al-'Asqalani (d. 852 AH), Al-Tawshih by al-Suyuti (d. 1505), Irshad al-Sari by al-Qastallani (d. 1517), Umdat al-Qari by Badr al-Din al-Ayni, and Al-Tanqih by al-Zarkashi (d. 1392). Modern commentaries are also written by Saeed Ahmad Palanpuri, Anwar Shah Kashmiri, Kausar Yazdani, Muhammad Taqi Usmani, and Muhammad Zakariyya Kandhalawi.

Few scholars have commented on Bukhari's reasons behind naming the chapters in his Sahih, known as tarjumat al-bab. Ibn Hajar al-Asqalani is noted to be one of them. Shah Waliullah Dehlawi had mentioned 14 reasons, later modified by Mahmud al-Hasan to make it 15. Kandhlawi is noted to have found as many as 70, even writing a book on the topic, Al-Abwab wat-Tarajim li Sahih al-Bukhari.

Translations 

Sahih al-Bukhari was originally translated into English by Muhammad Taqi-ud-Din al-Hilali and Muhammad Muhsin Khan, titled The Translation of the Meanings of Sahih al-Bukhari: Arabic-English (1971), derived from the Arabic text of Fath Al-Bari, published by the Egyptian Maktabat wa-Maṭbaʻat Muṣṭafá al-Bābī al-Ḥalabī in 1959. It is published by Al Saadawi Publications and Darussalam Publications and is included in the USC-MSA Compendium of Muslim Texts. Large numbers of hadith narrations included in Hilali and Khan's work have been translated by Muhammad Ali and Thomas Cleary. The book is also available in numerous languages including Urdu, Bengali, Bosnian, Tamil, Malayalam, Albanian, Malay, and Hindi, among others.

In 2019, the Arabic Virtual Translation Center in New York translated and published the first complete English translation of Sahih al-Bukhari titled Encyclopedia of Sahih Al-Bukhari, including explanatory notes, a glossary of every term, and biographies of all narrators in the isnad.

Reception 
Sunni Muslims regard Sahih al-Bukhari as one of the two most important books among the Kutub al-Sittah alongside the Sahih Muslim, written by al-Bukhari's student Muslim ibn al-Hajjaj. The two books are known as the 'Sahihayn (The Two Sahihs)'. Al-Nawawi wrote about Sahih al-Bukhari, "The scholars, may God have mercy on them, have agreed that the most authentic book after the dear Quran are the two Sahihs of Bukhari and Muslim." Siddiq Hasan Khan (d. 1890) wrote, "All of the Salaf and Khalaf assert that the most authentic book after the book of Allah is Sahih al-Bukhari and then Sahih Muslim."

In the Introduction to the Science of Hadith, Ibn al-Salah wrote: "The first to author a Sahih was Bukhari [...], followed by Abū al-Ḥusayn Muslim ibn al-Ḥajjāj an-Naysābūrī al-Qushayrī, who was his student, sharing many of the same teachers. These two books are the most authentic books after the Quran. As for the statement of Al-Shafi‘i, who said, "I do not know of a book containing knowledge more correct than Malik's book [Muwatta Imam Malik]," [...] he said this before the books of Bukhari and Muslim. The book of Bukhari is the more authentic of the two and more useful." Ibn al-Salah also quoted Bukhari as having said, "I have not included in the book [Sahih al-Bukhari] other than what is authentic and I did not include other authentic hadith for the sake of brevity." In addition, al-Dhahabi quoted Bukhari as having said, "I have memorized one hundred thousand authentic hadith and two hundred thousand which are less than authentic."

Criticism
Criticism has also been directed at apparent contradictions within Bukhari regarding the ahruf of the Quran. Some narrations state the Quran was revealed only in the dialect of Muhammad's tribe, the Quraysh, while others state it was revealed in seven ahruf. Certain prophetic medicine and remedies espoused in Bukhari, such as cupping, have been noted for being unscientific. Ibn Hajar al-Asqalani, on the basis of contrary archaeological evidence, criticised a hadith regarding Adam's height and human height.

In the 2003 book The Idea of Women in Fundamentalist Islam, Lamia Shehadeh used gender theory to critique an ahaad hadith about women's leadership. Another hadith reported by Abu Hurairah was criticized by Fatema Mernissi for being reported out of context and without any further clarification in the Sahih. The clarification is given in a hadith reported by Aisha in al-Zarkashi's (1344–1392) hadith collection. According to Charles Kurzman, this case raises the question of whether other narrations in Bukhari have been reported incompletely or lack proper context. In 2017, Rachid Aylal, a Quranist, published a book criticizing the Sahih, titled Sahih Al-Bukhari: The End of a Legend. It was banned in Morocco for disturbing spiritual security, due to pressure from Islamists.

On August 29, 2022 Ministry of Justice of the Russian Federation has included Sahih al-Bukhari into the federal list of extremist materials (except containing surahs, ayahs and quotes from the Quran) after The Supreme Court of Tatarstan supported the Laishevo District Court's decision to recognize the Sahih as extremist with its appellate ruling of July 5, 2022.

See also 

 Muhammad al-Bukhari, author of Sahih al-Bukhari
 Sahih Muslim, another Sahih collection of hadith narrations and the other of the 'Sahihayn'
 Muslim ibn al-Hajjaj, author of Sahih Muslim and student of Muhammad al-Bukhari
 Kutub al-Sittah, six most highly-regarded collections of hadith in Sunni Islam, one of which is Sahih al-Bukhari
 Fath al-Bari, most highly-regarded commentary on Sahih al-Bukhari
 Ibn Hajar al-Asqalani, 15th-century hadith scholar and author of Fath al-Bari

Notes

References

Citations

External links
 The Translation and the Meanings of Sahîh Al-Bukhâri: Arabic-English, trans. by Muhammad Muhsin Khan, ndw edn, 9 vols (Riyadh: Darussalam, 1997); also digitised in html
 Sahih Bukhari – Translation by Muhammad Muhsin Khan from Center for Muslim-Jewish Engagement (USC-MSA)
 A Manual of Hadith by Muhammad Ali, pdf – a selected compendium of Sahih al-Bukhari with commentary

Sunni literature
Hadith
Hadith studies
Hadith collections
Sunni hadith collections
9th-century Arabic books